The 5th Silver City Trophy was a motor race, run to Formula One rules, held on 1 August 1960 at Brands Hatch Circuit. The race was run over 50 laps of the circuit, and was won by Australian driver Jack Brabham who led from start to finish in a Cooper T53.

Results

References

 "The Grand Prix Who's Who", Steve Small, 1995.
 "The Formula One Record Book", John Thompson, 1974.

Silver City Trophy
Silver City Trophy